The Oldsmobile Achieva is a front-wheel drive compact sedan and coupe that was introduced by Oldsmobile for the 1992 model year. The Achieva was based on the GM N-body platform, which it also shared with its siblings the Pontiac Grand Am and Buick Skylark. The Achieva replaced the GM N-body Cutlass Calais after its final 1991 model year, and ended production after the 1998 model year.

Overview
The Achieva is a compact car produced by the General Motors' Oldsmobile division from 1991 until 1998 and was available as a sedan or coupe. It was offered in four different trim levels during its production run: S, SC, SL, and SCX. Available engines included different versions of the Oldsmobile-developed 2.3 L Quad 4 engine: the base single-cam L40 "Quad OHC", the DOHC LD2, the high-output LG0, and the special "W41" variant of the LG0 Quad 4 used in the SCX model. All were replaced for 1996 by a revised 2.4 L version. A pair of V6 engines were also offered including the Buick-sourced 90° 3.3 L "3300" V6, which was later replaced by Chevrolet's 60° 3.1 L "3100" V6. While a 5-speed manual transaxle was initially offered as the standard base transmission, most Achieva models were sold with 3-speed or 4-speed automatic transaxles. 1998 was the final model year for the Achieva, after which it was replaced in the Oldsmobile lineup by the Alero for the 1999 model year.

Initial production

The Achieva was first seen as a concept car at the 1991 Chicago Auto Show, positioned to replace Oldsmobile's compact Calais models. The Calais and Achieva share the same front wheel drive N-body architecture including identical wheelbase. The Achieva started regular production for the 1992 model year. It was offered in four different trim levels: S and SL, available on both coupes and sedans, and the sporty SC and SCX coupes. The base S offered a  2.3 L "Quad OHC" 4-cylinder, while the SL had the DOHC  Quad 4 engine standard that was optional on the S model. A  3.3 L V6 engine was optional for the SL.

SCX
The W41 coupe was introduced by Oldsmobile in 1991 on the Cutlass Calais and offered through 1993 on the Achieva. The Achieva SCX replaced the previous Cutlass Calais 442 W41 as the best handling, highest power output compact car in the Oldsmobile's lineup as well as being the last performance "W-Machine" Oldsmobile would offer. The SCX is a higher-performance version of the SC (sports coupe) and as such utilized the SC's deeper front bumper cover with standard fog lamps, lower body side cladding, rear bumper cover with dual exhaust tip cut-outs, as well as a unique W41-specific silver colored stripe around the lower body moldings, "W41" decals on the front fenders, and "Achieva SCX" decals at the leading edges of the doors. Other appearance changes for the SCX W41 package included the addition of a 140 mph speedometer in place of the standard 120 mph unit as well as a tachometer indicating the higher 7200 rpm red line.

Performance modifications primarily differentiated the SCX from the SC models and were designed to make the SCX competitive for use in showroom stock racing series such as the IMSA Firehawk and SCCA GRAND-AM World Challenge. This included the move to smaller diameter yet wider V-rated P215/60VR14 BF Goodrich Comp T/A tires on 14x6.5 inch cast aluminum wheels (compared to the SC's 205/55R16 on 16x6 inch wheels) and different suspension components on the SCX-specific FX3 RPO coded suspension. The suspension changes included larger diameter direct-acting front sway bar over the base Achieva, a wider rear axle with dual rear sway bars, "Computer Command Ride" (CCR) electronically adjustable struts and shock absorbers, as well as higher spring rates and bushing changes. (A similar CCR electronic suspension was also offered as an option on the Achieva SC as well as the platform-mate Buick Skylark and works similar to the systems offered on Cadillac and Corvette models of the time.)

The SCX's powertrain included the highest output naturally aspirated four-cylinder engine GM had produced up to that time: the 190 horsepower, 160 lb·ft W41 version of Oldsmobile's Quad 4 engine. Compared to the SC's standard high-output, 180 horsepower LGO Quad 4, the W41 version of the LGO Quad 4 was fitted with different camshafts, a low restriction exhaust system with dual mufflers and a special engine computer calibration for the ignition and fuel systems that also raised the engine's redline to 7200 rpm. This engine was complemented by a unique version of the Getrag-licensed, GM-Muncie built Getrag 282 five-speed transmission with special second and fifth gears as well as a different final drive ratio for quicker acceleration and better gearing to keep the engine in its power band.

The production numbers for the Achieva SCX in 1992 totaled 1146 cars made with (6) C41 RPO code A/C-delete racing models as follows: (1) bright red, (2) medium garnet red, (1) aqua, (1) blue, and (1) white cars. The normal C60 RPO code models included (472) bright red, (42) medium garnet red, (218) black, (196) aqua, (50) neon blue, (151) white, and (11) gray cars.

The 1993 SCX production totaled 500 cars produced including (5) C41 RPO code A/C-delete racing models as follows: (1) bright red, (1) aqua, and (3) white cars. The normal C60 RPO code models included (128) black, (191) bright red, (20) medium garnet red, (73) aqua, (8) neon blue, (70) white, and (5) majestic pearl cars.

Production changes
For the second year of production, all 1993 Achieva models saw a reduction in power across the engine lineup due to changes made to comply with stricter emission requirements. Other changes for 1993 included a revised front engine mount and changes to the Quad 4 block casting to address criticism for that engine's NVH characteristics. For 1994, a driver-side airbag was added as a standard feature, and the Buick-developed 3.3 L "3300" V6 was replaced by a Chevrolet-designed 3.1 L "3100" V6.

In 1995, trim levels were reduced to one: SC coupe and SL sedan, divided into two groups, Series I and Series II according to equipment.

The 1996 models added more standard features, include standard air conditioning and daytime running lamps, and a new dashboard featuring revised gauges and a passenger-side airbag. A Series III equipment level was added while the Series I was now only available on the coupe. The new base engine was a 2.4 liter four-cylinder "Twin Cam" that replaced the 2.3 L Quad 4. There were little changes other than reduced trim levels and options for the final two model years.

The final model year for the Achieva was 1998, with the majority of sales going to fleet customers. The Achieva was complemented at the end of its production run by the slightly larger Cutlass which overlapped Achieva production from 1997 to 1999. Both models were replaced in the Oldsmobile lineup by the Alero for 1999. The Cutlass and Alero were built on a redesigned GMX130 N-body platform that shared little chassis and platform architecture with the Achieva.

Achieva production ended on December 4, 1997.

Trim levels and engines

Trim levels
4-Door Sedan (1992–1998):
S - 1992–1995
SL - 1992-1998

2-Door Coupe (1992–1997):
S - 1992–1995
SC - 1992–1997
SCX - 1992–1993

Engines
 1992–1994 Quad OHC L40  I4,  and 
 1992–1995 Quad-4 LD2  I4, 155-180 hp and 
 1992–1994 Quad-4 LG0  I4, 175-180 hp and 
 1992–1993 Quad-4  I4, 185-190 hp and 160 lb·ft (SCX W41)
 1992–1993 3300  V6,  and 
 1994–1998 3100  V6  and 
 1996–1998 LD9  "Twin Cam" I4,  and

Motorsport

The Achieva won the touring car championship of the SCCA World Challenge from 1992-1994. As of 2020, Oldsmobile is the only GM division other than Chevrolet (Sonic) to accomplish this feat and only one of two American brands (along with Chrysler's Eagle Talon, 1989-1991) to accomplish it in the 1990s. The Dodge Shelby Charger won the predecessor SCCA / Escort Endurance Championship in 1986.

References

Compact cars
Coupés
Front-wheel-drive vehicles
Achieva
Sedans
Vehicles built in Lansing, Michigan
Cars introduced in 1991